Divine Brown is the self-titled debut album by Canadian R&B singer Divine Brown. The first single "Old Skool Love" was a hit on many radio stations such as CJFM.

Critical reception

Despite the record's middle portion having "a mild creative misstep" with doo wop production that's "old-fashioned and repetitive", Matthew Chisling from AllMusic said that "Divine Brown is one of those unfortunate artists who deserve so much more credit than they actually get. Brown's self titled debut album is a gorgeous display of talent […] The music on the album is just amazing."

Track listing

 (co.) Co-producer

Personnel
Adapted credits from the liner notes of Divine Brown.
Tom Coyne: mastering (Sterling Sound, NYC)
Chris Smith: executive producer
Noel "Gadget" Campbell: executive producer, A&R
Ray Hammond: A&R coordinator
Garnet Armstrong, Susan Michalek: Art direction and design
Michael Chambers: photography

References

2005 debut albums
Divine Brown albums
Albums produced by Noah "40" Shebib
Albums produced by Saukrates